Tomasz Sokolowski (born 25 June 1985 in Szczecin, Poland) is a Norwegian professional footballer who most recently played for Asker.

Career

Club
He is the son of former Polish footballer Kazimierz Sokolowski, who emigrated to Norway in 1991.

He started his senior career with Lyn, which he left after his contract expired at the end of the 2008 season. He joined Viking, leaving in November 2011, then Brann and Stabæk Fotball.

Sokolowski moved to Stabæk, initially on loan, in 2014, leaving the club at the end of the season after his contract expired. After not featuring in any club in 2015, he joined his youth club Asker for the 2016 season. He left the club again at the end of 2017, but made a comeback in May 2018, where he once again signed with the club, after not getting his contract extended at the end of 2017. But he left the club again, this time at the end of 2018, where his contract expired.

International
The younger Sokolowski was eligible to play for both Norway and Poland, but elected to play for Norway, and got his only cap in a January 2006 friendly against the United States.

Career statistics

References

External links

1985 births
Living people
Sportspeople from Szczecin
People from Asker
Polish emigrants to Norway
Naturalised citizens of Norway
Norwegian footballers
Norway international footballers
Lyn Fotball players
Viking FK players
SK Brann players
Stabæk Fotball players
Eliteserien players
Asker Fotball players
Norwegian Second Division players
Association football midfielders